Dyrham is a village and parish in South Gloucestershire, England.

Location and communications
Dyrham is at lat. 51° 29' north, long. 2° 22' west. It lies at an altitude of 100 metres above sea level. The Cotswold Way long-distance footpath runs through the village.

Administration
Dyrham is administered by the civil parish of Dyrham & Hinton and by the unitary authority of South Gloucestershire. The population of this parish was 296 at the 2011 census.

History

Dyrham is thought to have been the site of the important Battle of Deorham fought in AD 577 between the West Saxons under Ceawlin and Cuthwine, and the Britons of the West Country. The outcome of the battle was a decisive win for the West Saxons, allowing them to colonise three important cities, Glevum (Gloucester), Corinium (Cirencester) and Aquae Sulis (Bath).

The Domesday Book of 1086 records the tenant-in-chief of Dyrham as William FitzWido who held seven hides in Dyrham, formerly the land of Aluric. The manor passed to the Norman magnate Wynebald de Ballon, and then via the Newmarch family to the Russell family, notably being held by John Russell (died c.1224) and William Russell (1257–1311). By the 15th century the manor had passed into the Denys family, the most notable holder being William Denys (1470–1533). After the family accumulated debts in the 16th century, the manor was sold to the Wynter family and then the Blathwayte family, who built the present mansion known as Dyrham Park, which is said to incorporate some of the structure of the earlier manor house.

Nearby features
Dyrham Park. Dyrham Park was used as the set for the 1993 Merchant Ivory film The Remains of the Day and also for a BBC production of Dracula.
Dyrham Wood. A woodland named Dyrham Wood lies about a mile to the south of the village.
Lower Ledge Farm, south of the village, is where the new Farbio GTS sports car was made.

References

External links

Villages in South Gloucestershire District